Amparoina spinosissima is a species of fungus in the family Tricholomataceae, and the type species of the genus Amparoina. It was originally named Mycena spinosissima by mycologist Rolf Singer in 1951, who had originally found the species in Argentina in 1949. He transferred it to Amparoina in 1958.

Distribution
The fungus is found in tropical and subtropical regions, and has been collected in Argentina, Colombia, Japan, the Hawaiian Islands, New Caledonia, Costa Rica, and Puerto Rico.

References

External links

Tricholomataceae
Fungi of Asia
Fungi of North America
Fungi of South America
Fungi of Colombia
Fungi described in 1951
Taxa named by Rolf Singer